Bim or Bím may refer to the following people:
Given name or nickname
Bim Afolami, British politician
Bim Diederich (1922–2012), Luxembourger road bicycle racer
James May, English television presenter

Surname
Josef Bím (1901–1934), Czechoslovak soldier and skier

Masculine given names